Alexander Stephen and Sons Limited, often referred to simply as Alex Stephens or just Stephens, was a Scottish shipbuilding company based in Linthouse, Glasgow, on the River Clyde and, initially, on the east coast of Scotland.

History

The company's roots can be found in Alexander Stephen (1722–1793) who began shipbuilding at Burghead on the Moray Firth in 1750.

In 1793 William Stephen (1759–1838), a descendant of his, established a firm of shipbuilders at Footdee in Aberdeen.

In 1813 another member of the family, again called William (1789–1829), commenced shipbuilding at Arbroath.

Alexander Stephen (1795–1875), a member of the third generation of the family, merged the Aberdeen and Arbroath businesses in 1828 and then, after closing the Aberdeen yard in 1829, moved production to the Panmure yard in Dundee in 1842. In 1850 Alexander Stephen arranged a lease of the Kelvinhaugh yard in Glasgow from Robert Black for twenty years from May, 1851. The site of the Kelvinhaugh yard is now Yorkhill Quay. The Arbroath yard finally closed in 1857. Due to the restrictions in size of the Kelvinhaugh yard, as well as the impending expiry of the lease, in 1870 the Glasgow business moved to a new site at Linthouse. The Dundee shipyard was sold to the Dundee Shipbuilders' Company in 1893.

In a tragic disaster in 1883, the Daphne, a steamer, capsized after its launch from the Linthouse yard, and 124 workers lost their lives. 

In 1968, Stephens was incorporated into Upper Clyde Shipbuilders and was closed after the latter organisation collapsed in 1971. The engineering and ship repair elements of Alexander Stephen & Sons were not part of the UCS merger and continued until 1976, with the Company eventually wound up in 1982, when the shareholders were repaid.

There is no knowledge of the earliest ships built, but the last 153 which were built on the East Coast are recorded. On the Clyde the firm built 697 ships, 147 at the Kelvinhaugh shipyard and the remainder at Linthouse.

It was at Stephens shipyard that Billy Connolly served his apprenticeship as a boilermaker. In 1992, he returned to the site of the now-demolished shipyard he worked at 35 years earlier. "What an extraordinary feeling. I spent a great deal of my life in here. From age 16 to... well, I started at 15. I started my apprenticeship at 16 and finished when I was 21. Stayed till I was 22, and moved along. I finished welding when I was 24. When I came here, as an apprentice, there was six ships being built, right where I'm standing. It was an extraordinary place. A hive of activity. Welders, caulkers, platers, burners, joiners, engineers, electricians. I learned how men talked to one another, and how merciless Glasgow humour can be. It has made an indelible mark on me." His foreman was Sammy Boyd, but the two biggest influences on him, according to the book written by his wife Pamela, were Jimmy Lucas and Bobby Dalgleish. Jimmy was one of Billy's trainers in the yard who helped him to hone his skills as a welder and a comedian.

Part of the site is now occupied by a Thales Optronics facility, with the former main office building converted into lettable office space by Govan Workspace. The A-listed former Engine Shop was salvaged by the Scottish Maritime Museum in 1991 and rebuilt at its site in Irvine.

Ships built by Alexander Stephen and Sons
University of Glasgow Archives hold a number of separately catalogued records collections for various Clyde shipbuilding firms associated with the name Alexander Stephen. For ship's plans, two of the larger holdings are "Collection of miscellaneous ship plans built on the river Clyde, Glasgow, Scotland" (gb 248 GB 248 UGD 130/5) and "Records of Upper Clyde Shipbuilders Ltd, Linthouse Division, shipbuilders Glasgow, Scotland" (gb 248 GB 248 UGD 349). However the cataloging does not list names of individual vessels. Cataloguing is accessed via a link from the GLA home page, directly from the GLA search page.

The table below provides basic details of vessels from 1940, and it will be expanded to include other vessels. Further lists of vessels built by the firm can be found at the "Maritime History Virtual Archives": Arbroath yard list 1830-1843, Dundee yard list 1844-1893,  Linthouse yard-list 1870-1893.

References

External links
 
 William Stephen, Arbroath. Clyde Built Ships, yard list
 Alexander Stephen & Sons, Dundee. Clyde Built Ships, yard list
 Alexander Stephen & Sons, Kelvinhaugh. Clyde Built Ships, yard list
 Alexander Stephen & Sons, Govan. Clyde Built Ships, yard list

Alexander Stephens
Govan
British companies established in 1750
1750 establishments in Scotland
1982 disestablishments in Scotland
Manufacturing companies disestablished in 1982
Manufacturing companies established in 1750
River Clyde
Manufacturing companies based in Glasgow
Companies based in Aberdeen
Companies based in Dundee
British companies disestablished in 1982
British Shipbuilders